Zob Ahan Novin Isfahan Football Club is an Iranian football club based in Isfahan, Iran.  They are the reserve team of Zob Ahan, and currently compete in the 2011–12 Iran Football's 2nd Division.

Season-by-Season

The table below shows the achievements of the club in various competitions.

See also
 2011-12 Hazfi Cup
 2011–12 Iran Football's 2nd Division

Football clubs in Iran
Association football clubs established in 2005
2005 establishments in Iran
Defunct football clubs in Iran